Mingma Narbu Sherpa is an Indian politician. He was elected to the Sikkim Legislative Assembly from Daramdin in the 2019 Sikkim Legislative Assembly election as a member of the Sikkim Krantikari Morcha. He is Minister of Energy & Power and Labour in P. S. Golay Cabinet.

References

1971 births
Living people
Sikkim Krantikari Morcha politicians
People from Gyalshing district
Sikkim MLAs 2019–2024
University of North Bengal alumni